David Teeuwen (June 26, 1970 – November 4, 2015)  was the managing editor of USA Today where he helped pioneer digital news.

Early life and education
Teeuwen  was born in Norfolk, Virginia in 1970, but grew up in Youngstown, Ohio. He received a bachelor's degree in broadcast journalism from Ohio State University and a master's in mass communications at Miami University in Ohio.

Career
Teeuwen began his career in radio. He worked for Radio America in Washington, D.C., hosting a daily news program. He was hired by the USA TODAY, a Gannett-owned newspaper in 1999 as a multimedia producer, specializing in audio in the dotcom department that which at the time was separate from the print newsroom.

Teeuwen advanced his career at the dotcom department, and was promoted to senior producer of rich media. He later became deputy editor of the design department. In the early 2000s the department experimented with visual tools and interactive tools. He was viewed as open to new  platforms and experimentation, and as one with a  good sense of news and a no-nonsense approach.

In 2006, the print and dotcom news departments combined at USA TODAY. Unlike other employees with habits of the daily print cycle who struggled with  embracing the digital mindset, Teeuwen who combined digital savvy with journalism seized the opportunity to advance. After the integration, he  became website manager and oversaw the site's presentation and functionality.

In 2012, Teeuwen was named managing editor of real-time news by David Callaway, who himself was named editor in chief in July 2012 with a mandate to accelerate the transformation to digital-first. The newsroom was to function more like a wire service.

Illness and death
Teeuwen was diagnosed with intestinal cancer in 2006 which was supposedly cured after surgery and treatment. However, two years later, the cancer returned and doctors told him he would have less than 18 months to live. He continued to work while seeking other opinions and undergoing  treatments. On November 4, 2015, he died of intestinal cancer at the age of 45.

A student journalism award at USC has been named in his honor.

References

USA Today people
Deaths from cancer in the United States
American newspaper editors
Managing editors
2015 deaths
American male journalists
1970 births
Writers from Youngstown, Ohio
Ohio State University School of Communication alumni
Miami University alumni
Deaths from colorectal cancer
21st-century American journalists